Bideshak (also Romanized as Bīdeshak, Bidashk, and Bīdeshk; also known as Bidishk) is a village in Khabar Rural District, in the Central District of Baft County, Kerman Province, Iran. At the 2006 census, its population was 107, in 21 families.

References 

Populated places in Baft County